Rəzəvül (also, Razavuli and Rezavul) is a village in the Lerik Rayon of Azerbaijan.  The village forms part of the municipality of Nüvədi.

References 

Populated places in Lerik District